MB Doctrine is the foreign policy doctrine of former South Korean president Lee Myung-bak. The policy advocates engagement with North Korea and strong South Korea-United States relations.

References

See also
South Korea-United States relations
North Korea-South Korea relations

Foreign policy doctrines
Foreign relations of South Korea
Politics of South Korea